Openshaw is a suburb of Manchester, Greater Manchester, England, about three miles east of the Manchester city centre. Historically part of Lancashire, Openshaw was incorporated into the city of Manchester in 1890. Its name derives from the Old English Opinschawe, which means an open wood or coppice.

During the Second Industrial Revolution, when Openshaw become an area of heavy industry, socialism and trade unionism flourished. In 1910 the Openshaw Socialists were formed; Keir Hardie, founder of the Labour Party, spoke at their inaugural meeting. Annie Lee became Manchester's first socialist woman alderman in 1936, having been secretary of the Openshaw Independent Labour Party since the 1890s. Following profound de-industrialisation. Openshaw is now predominantly an African ethnic area with diverse shops and services opening reflecting this rapid change in demographic.

Industry
There is little industry in the district now. Very large enterprises such as a government munitions factory (ordnance works) and associated railway yards were closed after World War I. Companies which employed thousands of people, but of which nothing remains, include RHM, Ferguson, Pailin & Co (later GEC Switchgear), the English Steel Corporation, B&S Massey and Crossley Brothers, and the Gorton Works of the Manchester, Sheffield & Lincolnshire Railway, later the Great Central Railway followed by the London & North Eastern Railway.

Gorton Works exemplified the industries that sustained the economy of Openshaw and adjacent districts of Manchester during and after the Second Industrial Revolution. It was established in 1848 to service locomotives and build carriages and wagons. The first locomotive was built in 1858 and by 1923, Gorton Works had built more than 900 locomotives. The last steam engine was built for British Railways in 1950. The works then produced electric locomotives until it closed in 1963. The site is now the New Smithfield Wholesale Market, Manchester's wholesale fruit and vegetable market.

Openshaw is, however, within the East Manchester Regeneration Scheme and new businesses are moving into the area.

Education
There are four primary schools in Openshaw: Higher Openshaw Community Primary School, St Barnabas' CE Primary School, St Clement's CE Primary School and Varna Community Primary School.

Openshaw has Wright Robinson College ; The East Manchester Academy is nearby.

The Openshaw Campus of The Manchester College on Whitworth Street near Ashton Old Road (A635) specialises in new technical and industrial training, including construction craft and building services, motor engineering and computer technology.

Lime Square redevelopment
As part of the area's redevelopment under the East Manchester Regeneration Scheme, a new shopping precinct has been built called Lime Square. The majority of Lime Square is taken up by a Morrisons supermarket that was built in 2010, with The Range also in the same unit. It is also home to The Gym Group, McDonald's fast food restaurant, a doctors' surgery, several charity shops, a B & M, Greggs, Farmfoods, Savers, Poundland, Costa Coffee, and a Betfred bookmaker's, among others.

Transport
Gorton railway station provides frequent trains to Manchester Piccadilly on the Glossop–Hadfield and Rose Hill Marple line.

Openshaw is served by several bus services, most services are operated by Stagecoach Manchester.
 7: Ashton-under-Lyne – Gorton – Reddish – Stockport
 7A: Ashton-under-Lyne – Gorton – Reddish – Stockport
 7B: Ashton-under-Lyne – Droylsden – Reddish – Stockport
 171: Newton Heath – Gorton – Levenshulme – East Didsbury – Withington Hospital
 172: Chorlton-cum-Hardy – West Didsbury – Levenshulme – Gorton – Newton Heath
 219: Manchester – Openshaw – Guide Bridge – Ashton-under-Lyne – Stalybridge
 220: Manchester – Openshaw – Audenshaw – Dukinfield – Stalybridge
 221: Dukinfield – Audenshaw – Openshaw – Manchester

Music
English actor and lead vocalist for the Monkees, Davy Jones, was born in Leamington Street, Openshaw.

Composer Peter McGarr, born in 1953, lived in Openshaw for many years.

Openshaw media
From March 2002, the North East Manchester Advertiser newspaper was delivered free to every home in Openshaw, providing a local news source. However, in September 2012 the newspaper ceased publication. The Openshaw Gazette was launched in the same month; it now exists as a Facebook page and Twitter account.

Notes

References

External links

 Industry in 20th-century Openshaw
 Openshaw Gazette Facebook Group
 Openshaw Gazette Twitter Account

Areas of Manchester